Lowland Scots can refer to:

 people of Lowland Scotland
 Scots language

Language and nationality disambiguation pages